Kune may refer to:

 Kune (software), a distributed social network software
 The Kune dialect of the Bininj Kunwok language, an Aboriginal Australian language
The people associated with the dialect, one of the Bininj group

Croatia
 Kune, the plural form of the currency Croatian kuna
Tank Battalion "Kune" (Croatia), a Croatian army armoured unit
3rd Guards Brigade "Kune" (Croatia), a disbanded Croatian army armoured unit

See also
Kuna (disambiguation)
Kunekune, a breed of domestic pig